The Hermoyne Apartments is a historic apartment-hotel in Los Angeles, California. It is located at 569 North Rossmore Avenue.

History
The Hermoyne Apartments were erected at the intersection of Rossmore Avenue and North Rosewood Avenue in 1929, underwritten by Herbert "H.B." Squires, whose personal company was "one of the largest purveyors of electric equipment to the motion picture and other large industries in the 1920s." Originally 156 rooms, with 54 apartments, the seven-story facade allegedly cost $425,000 to build. It featured the rare amenity at the time of underground parking. San Francisco architect Leonard L. Jones designed the building and the building's "twin," Castle Argyle Arms at 1919 North Argyle Ave. as well as the Norton Flats.

Legacy
The Hermoyne is still an operational residential apartment structure and is managed by Harrison Properties.

References

Hotels in Los Angeles
1929 establishments in California
Hotels established in 1929
Hotel buildings completed in 1929
Commercial buildings completed in 1929
Buildings and structures in Los Angeles